The Pusey and Jones Corporation was a major shipbuilder and industrial-equipment manufacturer. Based in Wilmington, Delaware, it operated from 1848 to 1959.

Shipbuilding was its primary focus from 1853 until the end of World War II, when the company converted the shipyard to produce machinery for paper manufacturing. The yard built more than 500 ships, from large cargo vessels to small warships and yachts, including Volunteer, the winner of the 1887 America’s Cup.

History
The company began in 1848, when Joshua L. Pusey and John Jones formed a partnership in Wilmington, Delaware, to run a machine shop in space rented from a whaling company. The shipyard sat between the Christina River and the main line of the Pennsylvania Railroad.

In 1851, Edward Betts and Joshua Seal, who were operating an iron foundry in Wilmington, purchased an interest in the business. The name of the company became Betts, Pusey, Jones & Seal.

In 1854, Pusey and Jones built the first U.S. iron-hulled sailing vessel: a schooner named Mahlon Betts after Edward's father, who had built the foundry.

At the beginning of the Civil War the company began building vessels for the U.S. military. The first was a sloop of war, which required immediate expansion of the workforce. The company also built engines and boilers for other shipbuilding firms.

In 1887, the company built the first steel-hulled yacht to win the America’s Cup, "Volunteer".
 
During World War I, the firm grew to more than 2,000 employees. It established the Pennsylvania Shipbuilding Corporation shipyard in Gloucester City, New Jersey, with four ways capable of launching ships up to 12,500 tons and two ways of up to 7,000 tons. Shortly thereafter, the New Jersey Shipbuilding Corporation was formed and their shipyard, which was virtually an addition to the Pennsylvania S.B. yard, was planned to have six slipways for building 5,000-ton cargo steam ships. The keel of the first 7,000dwt tanker was laid on 9 September 1916.

These two yards delivered 20 ships to the United States Shipping Board, all requisitions:

 6 tankers of 7,000dwt
 11 cargo ships of 12,500dwt
 Yard#7, War Serpent, launched as Indianapolis
 3 cargo ships of 5,000dwt

The Wilmington yard delivered 14 vessels, all requisitions, and two minesweepers for the United States Navy:

 6 cargo, 2,600t
 8 cargo, 3,000t
 2 of 49 s
 , 

After the business slump of the early 1920s, the company reorganized in 1927 under businessman Clement C. Smith, becoming Pusey and Jones Corporation. The company focused on building large luxury steam and motor yachts for wealthy patrons.

As World War II approached, military orders increased. The highest employment was reached during World War II, when more than 3,600 employees worked in the shipyards, plants and offices of the company. Pusey and Jones built 19 Type C1 ships for the U.S. Maritime Commission.

Other craft such as minesweepers were built, along with specialty and smaller vessels. Many commercial and private vessels originally built by the company were also converted to military use.

On Liberty Fleet Day — September 27, 1941 — the yard launched the SS Adabelle Lykes.

After World War II, Pusey and Jones converted the shipyard's facilities to manufacture papermaking machinery.

The company closed in 1959.

Notable vessels

See also 
 :Category:Ships built by Pusey and Jones
 Harlan and Hollingsworth: Nearby shipyard in Wilmington, Delaware
 Jackson and Sharp Company: Nearby shipyard in Wilmington, Delaware

References

External links
Pusey and Jones paper industry website
List of ships built at the Wilmington shipyard shipbuildinghistory.com
List of ships built at the Gloucester City shipyard shipbuildinghistory.com
Wilmington Industrial History by Patrick Harshbarger
Delaware River Shipyards yorkship.com
Shipyards and Suppliers for U. S. Maritime Commission During World War II usmm.org
Ship builders and Owners (list) wrecksite.eu
Wilmington Strike Ends; Workers Return Today to Pusey & Jones Shipyards New York Times, December 5, 1941

Volunteer Americascup.com
Outboard Profiles of Maritime Commission Vessels, The C1 Cargo Ship, Conversions and Subdesigns
WWI Standard Built Ships, Shipbuilding Yards
Photos of Pusey and Jones ships and facilities
Building the Lydonia II Digital exhibit about a ship built at Pusey and Jones

Defunct shipbuilding companies of the United States
Maritime history of Delaware
Wilmington Riverfront
Companies based in Wilmington, Delaware
American companies established in 1848
Manufacturing companies established in 1848
Manufacturing companies disestablished in 1959
1959 disestablishments in Delaware
America's Cup yacht builders
1848 establishments in Delaware
Papermaking in the United States
Industrial machine manufacturers
American companies disestablished in 1959
Defunct manufacturing companies based in Delaware